Frederick Kerseboom (1632–1690) was a German painter, sometimes called Frederick Casaubon in England.

Life
Born at Solingen in Germany, he studied painting in Amsterdam, and in 1650 was at Paris, where he worked under Charles Le Brun. He subsequently went to Rome, and remained there for 14 years, two of which he spent under Nicolas Poussin.

On leaving Rome Kerseboom came to England, where he devoted himself to portrait-painting. He died in London in 1690, and was buried in St. Andrew's Church, Holborn.

Family
Johann Kerseboom was the nephew of Frederick, and came to England with him. Some of the noted portraits that in the past were attributed to the uncle are now considered to be by him.

Notes

Attribution

1632 births
1690 deaths
17th-century German painters
German male painters
German portrait painters
People from Solingen